James L. Bell was an American ice hockey player and head coach for the Northeastern.

Career
Bell Started his playing career at Northeastern just after World War II. As a sophomore he was selected as a second team All-American and played three seasons for the Huskies before forgoing his final year of eligibility to play professionally. Bell returned to Northeastern and graduated in 1954 and after an 11-game stint with the Worcester Warriors he was chosen to succeed his former bench boss Herb Gallagher as coach of the Huskies.

Bell coached the men's team for fifteen seasons, producing respectable if unspectacular records. He led the team to its first two appearances in the ECAC Tournament but towards the end of his tenure the team was known more for losing than anything else. Bell resigned from his position after the Huskies finished dead last in 1969–70. After hockey Bell joined the engineering firm of Fenton G. Keyes Associates where he worked until his retirement.

Jim Bell was named as the New England Coach of the Year in 1956 and was the recipient of the Shaeffer Pen Award in 1970. He was an inaugural member of the Northeastern University Athletic Hall of Fame in 1974.

Head coaching record

Awards and honors

References 

Year of birth missing
1998 deaths
Ice hockey players from Massachusetts
People from Waltham, Massachusetts
American ice hockey coaches
Northeastern Huskies men's ice hockey players
Northeastern Huskies men's ice hockey coaches
AHCA Division I men's ice hockey All-Americans
Ice hockey coaches from Massachusetts